

World Championships
The World Road championships were held in Copenhagen, Denmark.

Grand Tours

UCI WorldTour

2.HC Category Races

1.HC Category Races

UCI tours

National Championships

References

See also
2011 in women's road cycling

 
2012